Spurious languages are languages that have been reported as existing in reputable works, while other research has reported that the language in question did not exist. Some spurious languages have been proven to not exist. Others have very little evidence supporting their existence, and have been dismissed in later scholarship. Others still are of uncertain existence due to limited research. 

Below is a sampling of languages that have been claimed to exist in reputable sources but have subsequently been disproved or challenged. In some cases a purported language is tracked down and turns out to be another, known language. This is common when language varieties are named after places or ethnicities.

Some alleged languages turn out to be hoaxes, such as the Kukurá language of Brazil or the Taensa language of Louisiana. The error was corrected three times that year, but nonetheless "Hongote" was still listed as a Patagonian language a century later in Greenberg (1987).

In the case of New Guinea, one of the most linguistically diverse areas on Earth, some spurious languages are simply the names of language surveys that the data was published under.

Dubious languages
Dubious languages are those whose existence is uncertain. They include:
 Oropom (Uganda)
 Nemadi (Mauritania)
 Rer Bare (Ethiopia) – extinct, if it ever existed
 Tapeba (Brazil) [] – a recently created indigenous ethnicity, not a language
 Ladakhi Sign Language – no community to use it
 Dek (Cameroon)

Spurious according to Glottolog
Glottolog, maintained at the Max Planck Institute for Evolutionary Anthropology in Leipzig, classifies several languages, some with ISO 639 codes, as spurious/unattested.  These include:

 Parsi [] (a dialect of Gujarati) and -Dari [] (Zoroastrian Dari) – an ethnicity, not a language 
 Adabe [] – a dialect of Wetarese, taken for a Papuan language 
  – the people spoke Old Tupi
  – a word list of mislabeled ǀXam mixed with other !Ui languages
 Chamari [], a caste, not a language
 Judeo-Berber [] – According to Glottolog, Jewish Berbers speak no differently than Muslim Berbers However, there are claims, listed in the linked article, that this is not true.
 Pisabo [] – reported to be mutually intelligible with Matsés, so perhaps not a distinct language

Also some Aeta ethnic names with no cultural memory of an extinct language:
  [ays]
  [ayy]
  [dyg]

Other ISO codes that Glottolog regards as spurious, because they are not a distinct language, are polyphyletic (not a single language), or have not been shown to exist, include:
 Guajajara [gub] – mutually-intelligible with Tenetehara [tqb]
 Norra [nrr]
 South Ucayali Ashéninka [cpy]
 Moabite [obm], Ammonite [qgg], and Edomite [xdm]
 Syenara [shz] and Shempire [seb]
 [cca] – presumed to be from the Cauca Valley, but no such language is known, unless it is the undemonstrated Quimbaya
 [agi] (an ambiguous ethnic term; all varieties already covered by ISO)
 [kym] – purportedly the original language of the Kpatili people, who now speak Gbayi, but any such language is unattested
 [faz] – all likely candidates in the area already have ISO codes

Ir [irr], 
Skagit [ska], 
Snohomish [sno], 
Ahirani [ahr], 
Pokangá [pok], 
Chetco [ctc], 
Arakwal [rkw], 
Anasi [bpo], 
Yarí* [yri], 
Yola [yol], 
Seru* [szd], 
Gowli [gok], 
Mina (India) [myi], 
Degaru* [dgu], 
Bubia [bbx], 
Gbati-ri [gti], 
Tetete* [teb], 
Kannada Kurumba [kfi], 
Vatrata* [vlr], 
Kofa* [kso], 
Old Turkish [otk], 
Tingui-Boto* [tgv], 
Imeraguen [ime], 
Yauma [yax], 
Rufiji [rui], 
Ngong [nnx], 
Dombe [dov], 
Subi* [xsj], 
Mawayana* [mzx], 
Kwak [kwq], 
Potiguára* [pog], 
Coxima* [kox], 
Chipiajes* [cbe], 
Cagua* [cbh], 
Kakauhua(*) [kbf], 
Yangho* [ynh], 
Takpa* [tkk], 
N'Ko(*) [nqo], 
Sara Dunjo [koj], 
Putoh [put], 
Bainouk-Samik [bcb], 
Kamba (Brazil)* [xba], 
Bikaru-Bragge* [bic], 
Baga Binari(*) [bcg], 
Baga Sobané(*) [bsv], 
Ontenu* [ont], 
Baga Kaloum(*) [bqf], 
Munda [unx], 
Aduge* [adu], 
Khalaj** [kjf], 
Buso* [bso], 
Uokha* [uok], 
Ihievbe* [ihi], 
Coyaima* [coy], 
Natagaimas* [nts], 
Odut* [oda], 
Chilean Quechua [cqu], 
Quetzaltepec Mixe [pxm], 
Kang [kyp], 
Thu Lao [tyl], 
Pu Ko* [puk], 
Gey(*) [guv], 
Kakihum* [kxe], 
Bonjo* [bok], 
Katukína* [kav], 
Lui(*) [lba], 
Lama (Myanmar)(*) [lay], 
Inpui Naga* [nkf], 
Puimei Naga* [npu], 
Purum(*) [pub], 
Welaung* [weu], 
Lumba-Yakkha* [luu], 
Phangduwali [phw] / Lambichhong* [lmh], 
Lingkhim(*) [lii], 
Northwestern Tamang(*) [tmk], 
Southwestern Tamang [tsf], 
Kayort* [kyv], 
Loarki [lrk], 
Con [cno], 
Gengle [geg], 
Kuanhua* [xnh], 
Yarsun [yrs], 
Kabixí* [xbx], 
Vasekela Bushman [vaj], 
Maligo [mwj], 
Pao [ppa], 
Bhalay [bhx] / Gowlan* [goj], 
Balau* [blg], 
Kuku-Mangk [xmq], 
Buya* [byy], 
Aramanik [aam], 
Mediak [mwx], 
Kisankasa [kqh], 
Southwestern Nisu[*are any valid?] [nsv], 
Tawang Monpa* [twm], 
Adap [adp], 
Southern Lolopo [ysp], 
Eastern Lalu [yit], 
Ndonde Hamba* [njd], 
Lang'e* [yne], 
Lopi* [lov], 
Laopang [lbg], 
Kunggara [kvs], 
Chuanqiandian Cluster Miao [cqd], 
Karipuna do Amapa* [kgm]

Spurious according to Ethnologue and ISO 639-3
Following is a list of ISO 639-3 language codes which have been retired since the standard was established in 2006, arranged by the year in which the change request was submitted; in most cases the actual retirement took effect in the beginning of the following year.  Also included is a partial list of languages (with their SIL codes) that appeared at one time in Ethnologue but were removed prior to 2006, arranged by the first edition in which they did not appear.

The list includes codes that have been retired from ISO 639-3 or languages removed from Ethnologue because the language apparently does not exist and cannot be identified with an existing language. The list does not include instances where the "language" turns out to be a spelling variant of another language or the name of a village where an already known language is spoken; these are cases of duplicates, which are resolved in ISO 639-3 by a code merger. It does include "languages" for which there is no evidence or which cannot be found. (In some cases, however, the evidence for nonexistence is a survey among the current population of the area, which would not identify extinct languages such as Ware below.)

SIL codes are upper case; ISO codes are lower case. Once retired, ISO 639-3 codes are not reused.  SIL codes that were retired prior to 2006 may have been re-used or may have reappeared as ISO codes for other languages.

Removed from Ethnologue, 12th ed., 1992
  (PNG) []
  (Brazil) []
  (PNG) []
 ,  (Brazil) []
  []
  (PNG) []
  (Mexico) [] – added to Ethnologue 1988 by mistake due to a misunderstanding, removed in 1992. No evidence that it ever existed.
  Senoufo [] – the Tyeliri are a caste of leather workers, and do not have their own language
  []
  – name of an ethnic group that speaks Yongkom [yon]

Removed from Ethnologue, 13th ed., 1996
  (PNG) [] – described as "isolate in need of survey" in the 12th ed.

Removed from Ethnologue, 14th ed., 2000
  2 [] – a mislabeled fragment of a word list
  [],  [],  [],  [],  [],  [] – old names for Qiangic languages, some of uncertain correspondence to currently recognized names
  [] – an ethnic name for people speaking a variety of Qiangic or Jiarongic languages
 Scandinavian Pidgin Sign Language [] – normal inter-language contact, not an established pidgin
 Wutana (Nigeria) [] – an ethnic name

Removed from Ethnologue, 15th ed., 2005
  []
 []
- [], incl. /
 [] (though other languages without ISO codes, such as Wila', are also called Lowland Semang)
Mutús [] – suspected to exist, e.g. by Adelaar 2005
 []
 [] – same as Tanjijili? Also a possible synonym for Kwak (retired in 2015)
 [] – no evidence it is distinct from Fungom and Bum
 []
 []

Retired 2006
 [] – unattested
 [] – an old town name
 Creole []

Retired 2007
 []
 Land Dayak [] – language family name, not individual language
Ware [] – Ware is listed as extinct in Maho (2009). When an SIL team in Tanzania were not able to find any evidence of it being spoken, the code was retired. 
 River Kenyah [],  River Kenyah [],  Kenyah [],  Kenyah [] – Any current use is likely either Mainstream Kenyah [] or Uma' Lung []

Retired 2008
Aariya []
 [] – name given to several uncontacted groups
 [] – prison jargon
Europanto [] – a jest
- [] (Borana & Somali)
Sufrai [] – two languages, Tarpia and Kaptiau, which are not close

Retired 2010
Ayi (China) []
 (India) []
 []

Retired 2011
 []
Pongyong []
Elpaputih [] – could be either of two existing languages

Retired 2012
Malakhel [] – likely Ormuri
Forest Maninka [] – generic
Wirangu-Nauo [] – the two varieties which do not form a unit

Retired 2013
Gugu Mini [] – a generic name
 Pidgin [] – never existed
 [] – never existed
Yugh [] – duplicate of Yug []
Lamam [] – duplicate of Romam []

Retired 2014
Mator-Taygi-Karagas [] – duplicate of Mator
Yiddish Sign Language [] – no evidence that it existed
The [] – duplicate of Oy
 Imraguen (Mauritania) [] 
  [] – perhaps a typo for Boma (Eboma)
Bemba [] – a tribal name
Songa [] – a tribal name
Daza []   – retired in 2014 (with the reason "Nonexistent") but that decision was reversed in 2022, bringing [dzd] back
Buya [] 
Kakauhua [] – Kakauhua/Caucahue is an ethnonym, language unattested – see Alacalufan languages
Subi [] – duplicate of Shubi [suj] but that decision was reversed in 2018, bringing [xsj] back
 [] – does not exist
=/Kx'au//'ein [] – dialect of Juǀʼhoan [ktz]

Retired 2015
 [btl]
 [cbh]
 [cbe] – a Saliba and Guahibo surname
 [kox]
  [] – uncontacted, and likely one of the neighboring languages
 [xbx] – generic name for Parecis, Nambiquaras, or any hostile group (see Cabixi language for one specific use)
 [rna]
  (Dravidian) []
 Xipináwa []
 [yri]

And several supposed extinct Arawakan languages of Venezuela and Colombia:
  []  
  []
  [] – a Sáliba surname, perhaps just Piapoco or Achagua
    []

Additional languages and codes were retired in 2015, due to a lack of evidence that they existed, but were not necessarily spurious as languages.

Retired 2016
 Lua' []
 Rennellese Sign Language [] – a home sign system, not a full language
  []
  []
  [] – no substantive evidence that the language ever existed.

Retired 2017
  [] – no substantive evidence that the language ever existed.
  []
  [] – a clan name

Retired 2018
  []
  [] – duplicate of Kriang []
  [] – Meena, a tribe and caste name in India

Retired 2019
  []
  []
  []
  [] 
  []
  []
  []
  []
  []
  []
 Palpa []
  []

Retired 2020
Bikaru [bic] – posited based on a poor elicitation of ordinary Bisorio

Retired 2021
  []
  []

Retired 2022
  [] – duplicate of Tupinamba [tpn]
  [] – duplicate of Palikur [plu]
  [] – duplicate of Khakas [kjh]
  []
 Parsi []

References and notes

External links
.